Boulevard Records may refer to:

 Boulevard Records (U.S.), an American record label (fl. 1954)
 Boulevard Records (Canada), a  Canadian record label of the 1980s

Similar names
 Blues Boulevard Records, a Florida based record label